Acynodon is an extinct genus of eusuchian crocodylomorph from the Late Cretaceous, with fossils found throughout Southern Europe.

Classification
The genus Acynodon contains three species: A. iberoccitanus, A. adriaticus, and A. lopezi.  Fossils have been found in France, Spain, Italy, and Romania, dating back to the Santonian and Maastrichtian periods of the Late Cretaceous.

When first described in 1997, it was placed within the family Alligatoridae. New findings a decade later led to it being reclassified as a basal globidontan. Recent studies have since resolved Acynodon as a basal eusuchian crocodylomorph, outside of the Crocodylia crown group, and a close relative to Hylaeochampsa.

Description
The skull of Acynodon is extremely brevirostrine; it had a very short and broad snout compared to other known alligatorids. Its dentition was quite derived, with enlarged molariform teeth and a lack of maxillary and dentary caniniform teeth, presumably an adaptation to feed on slow prey with hard shells. The paravertebral osteoderms of Acynodon were distinctively double-keeled.

References

Neosuchians
Late Cretaceous crocodylomorphs of Europe
Late Cretaceous reptiles of Europe
Fossil taxa described in 1997
Prehistoric pseudosuchian genera